The Final was the farewell concert by English musical duo Wham! It was held at Wembley Stadium, London on Saturday 28 June 1986. A total of 72,000 people attended the event, which included support artists and special guests, such as Elton John and Simon Le Bon . The concert was preceded by the release of the greatest hits album of the same name.

Background
Wham! had announced their breakup in 1986. During late February Michael was a guest on the talk show Aspel & Company, he announced that Wham! were to break-up and were to perform one last show. 

During production rehearsals for the Wembley concert, Wham! performed two warm-up shows in aid of Capital radio’s “Help a London Child” charity on 23 and 24 June at the Brixton Academy in London.  

In an interview in October 2019, Ridgeley said that the concert was unlikely to be released stating “I would love that to happen, but it was never actually filmed or recorded for broadcast and George felt it wasn’t of the quality that he would be prepared to be made public.”  

Ridgeley also said of the concert, that he had wanted to take the show internationally and that he was disappointed saying “I felt that it was a slight betrayal of the fans who had supported us globally.”

Synopsis

The first ever public viewing of the Wham! in China: Foreign Skies documentary film was shown on large screens on either side of the stage. This set a record for the largest audience at a film premiere.

At 7.35pm an eight-minute introduction to "Everything She Wants" began from behind a huge black curtain which had "The Final" on it in huge white letters. It opened to reveal Michael - dressed in leather, black jeans, wearing sunglasses and danced in sync with two other dancers. Ridgeley, Shirley and Pepsi came to the stage. Ridgeley took off his black coat and strolled up the walkways and took off his black gloves. "Club Tropicana" followed. Michael spoke to the crowd "This is the best thing I've ever looked at". We've got four years of thank-yous to say this evening... and I know we're going to enjoy saying them. So let's get started!". "Heartbeat" and "Battlestations" was performed.

Afterwards, it was "Bad Boys", Pepsi and Shirlie made a brief appearance wearing bouffant wigs;  included was "If You Were There". A large white piano was wheeled on stage, Elton John was dressed in Ronald McDonald make-up and costume, a shiny red wig, a red nose, a stripey red t-shirt and yellow dungarees. Guitarist David Austin joined and "The Edge of Heaven" begins. Michael split the audience into three groups, with each group to sing a section. They performed John’s 1973 hit "Candle In The Wind".
"Credit Card Baby", "Like A Baby", "Love Machine", "Where Did Your Heart Go?" had followed in quick succession. 

There was a pause before a cover of Carly Simon’s "Why" is performed. Wham! began their single "Last Christmas". Michael got the audience to do the "Wave" and everyone showed the orange side of their programmes. It transferred into "Wham! Rap". 
After the ballad "A Different Corner" and "Freedom" ended, they disappeared for a short while and came back for "Careless Whisper" and "Young Guns". Michael ran around the stage performing "Wake Me Up Before You Go-Go".
The band comes back to do the encore, their last song, "I'm Your Man". They were alone on stage. Michael took off his black jacket, while Ridgeley was in suede with denim flies.
Elton John again joined in a pink mohican. Simon Le Bon (of Duran Duran) made a surprise entrance on stage. Wham! embraced, the moment captured on the large screens.

Opening acts
 Gary Glitter
 Nick Heyward

Set list
 "Everything She Wants"
 "Club Tropicana"
 "Heartbeat"
 "Battlestations" 
 "Bad Boys"
 "If You Were There"
 "The Edge of Heaven"
 "Candle in the Wind" (ft. Elton John)
 "Credit Card Baby"
 "Like A Baby"
 "Love Machine"
 "Where Did Your Heart Go?"
 "Why"
 "Last Christmas"
 "Wham Rap! (Enjoy What You Do)"
 "A Different Corner"
 "Freedom"
 "Careless Whisper"
 "Young Guns (Go For It)"
 "Wake Me Up Before You Go-Go"
Encore
 21. "I'm Your Man" (ft. Elton John / Simon Le Bon)

Show

Source:

Personnel

George Michael - Lead vocals
Andrew Ridgeley - Guitar
Helen "Pepsi" DeMacque - Backing vocals
Shirlie Holliman - Backing vocals
Guests
Elton John 
Simon Le Bon

References 

George Michael concert tours
1986 concert tours